James Ruffin McKinley (February 25, 1945 – July 6, 2012) was an American football player, coach, and businessman. He coached football teams at several historically black colleges and universities, was a defensive coach for the Oklahoma Outlaws of the United States Football League (USFL), and served as executive director of the Heritage Bowl, which he helped create.

Playing career
McKinley played at tight end for Western Michigan University's football team, was named to WMU's All Century Football Team in 2005 and was inducted into the WMU Athletic Hall of Fame in 1992.

Coaching career

Central State
McKinley got his first head coaching position at Central State University in Wilberforce, Ohio from 1974 until the end of the 1976 seasons.

North Carolina A&T
After coaching at Central State, McKinley moved on to be the head football coach at North Carolina A&T State University from 1977 to 1981

Prairie View A&M
McKinley was the 14th head football coach at Prairie View A&M University, serving two season, from 1982 to 1983, and compiling a record of 1–21.

Other coaching positions
McKinley's coaching career also took him to Eastern Michigan University, USFL’s Oklahoma Outlaws, where he served as defensive line coach, and the University of Missouri.

Business accomplishments
McKinley started McKinley Financial Services, Inc., in Fort Lauderdale, Florida.  The company has become one of the largest minority insurance agencies in the United States with over 50 agents and staff.  He was awarded the 2007 Distinguished Alumni Award from Western Michigan University, where he received his Bachelor of Arts in 1966.

Heritage Bowl
In 1991, McKinley formulated the idea of the Heritage Bowl, an annual college football bowl game matching up two Division I-AA teams left out of the division's playoff system. McKinley served as the bowl's executive director in its first years. Despite massive financial losses, poor attendance, protests from neighborhood residents, and a lack of television coverage in its first year, the bowl continued to be played every year until 1999, when the game was discontinued.

Head coaching record

References

External links
 

1945 births
2012 deaths
American football tight ends
College football bowl executives
Eastern Michigan Eagles football coaches
Central State Marauders football coaches
Missouri Tigers football coaches
North Carolina A&T Aggies athletic directors
North Carolina A&T Aggies football coaches
Prairie View A&M Panthers football coaches
United States Football League coaches
Western Michigan Broncos football players
High school football coaches in Michigan
Players of American football from Chicago
African-American coaches of American football
African-American players of American football
African-American college athletic directors in the United States
20th-century African-American sportspeople
21st-century African-American sportspeople